The Act of Accord was an Act of the Parliament of England which was passed on 25 October 1460, three weeks after Richard of York had entered the Council Chamber and laid his hand on the empty throne. Under the Act, King Henry VI of England was to retain the crown for life but York and his heirs were to succeed him, excluding Henry's son, Edward of Westminster. Henry was forced to agree to the Act.

Far from ending the Wars of the Roses, it split the kingdom further, as it was unacceptable to the queen, Margaret of Anjou, who saw her son disinherited, while retaining a large body of Lancastrian supporters. In the immediate aftermath, the Lancastrians defeated and killed York in December 1460 (even though the Act had made it high treason to kill him), but they were in turn defeated in spring 1461 by York's son Edward, who then became king.

In the same parliament (on 31 October), York was made Prince of Wales and Earl of Chester, Duke of Cornwall and Lord Protector of England.

See also
House of Plantagenet

Notes

Further reading

Britain Express: The Act of Accord
Full text of the Act, from Davies, John S., An English Chronicle of the Reigns of Richard II, Henry IV, Henry V, and Henry VI, folios 208-211 (from Googlebooks, retrieved 15 August 2012)
 Warwick the Kingmaker, Hicks, Michael; Oxford 1998

Acts of the Parliament of England
1460s in law
1460 in England
Wars of the Roses